Brausewetter is a German surname. Notable people with the surname include:

 Hans Brausewetter (1899–1945), German silent film actor
 Michael Brausewetter
 Renate Brausewetter (1905–2006), German silent film actress, younger sister of Hans Brausewetter

German-language surnames